The 1985 CCHA Men's Ice Hockey Tournament was the 14th CCHA Men's Ice Hockey Tournament. It was played between March 8 and March 16, 1985. First round games were played at campus sites, while 'final four' games were played at Joe Louis Arena in Detroit, Michigan. By winning the tournament, Michigan State received the Central Collegiate Hockey Association's automatic bid to the 1985 NCAA Division I Men's Ice Hockey Tournament.

Format
The tournament featured three rounds of play. The team that finished below eighth place in the standings was not eligible for postseason play. In the quarterfinals, the first and eighth seeds, the second and seventh seeds, the third seed and sixth seeds and the fourth seed and fifth seeds played a two-game series where the team that scored the higher number of goals after the games was declared the victor and advanced to the semifinals. In the semifinals, the remaining highest and lowest seeds and second highest and second lowest seeds play a single-game, with the winners advancing to the finals. The tournament champion receives an automatic bid to the 1985 NCAA Division I Men's Ice Hockey Tournament.

Conference standings
Note: GP = Games played; W = Wins; L = Losses; T = Ties; PTS = Points; GF = Goals For; GA = Goals Against

Bracket

Note: * denotes overtime period(s)

First round

(1) Michigan State vs. (8) Miami

(2) Lake Superior State vs. (7) Michigan

(3) Western Michigan vs. (6) Ohio State

(4) Bowling Green vs. (5) Illinois–Chicago

Semifinals

(1) Michigan State vs. (6) Ohio State

(2) Lake Superior State vs. (4) Bowling Green

Consolation Game

(4) Bowling Green vs. (6) Ohio State

Championship

(1) Michigan State vs. (2) Lake Superior State

Tournament awards

All-Tournament Team
F Craig Simpson (Michigan State)
F Kelly Miller (Michigan State)
F Tom Anastos (Michigan State)
D Donald McSween (Michigan State)
D Dan McFall (Michigan State)
G Norm Foster* (Michigan State)
* Most Valuable Player(s)

References

External links
CCHA Champions
1984–85 CCHA Standings
1984–85 NCAA Standings

CCHA Men's Ice Hockey Tournament
Ccha tournament